This is a list of National Football League (NFL) players who have led the regular season in sacks each year. Sacks became an official statistic in 1982. Michael Strahan of the New York Giants and T. J. Watt of the Pittsburgh Steelers hold the record with 22.5, which Strahan had during the 2001 season, and Watt during the 2021 season. In 2013, the NFL created the Deacon Jones Award to recognize the season leader in sacks. There have only been two players who have led the league in sacks with 2 different teams, Jared Allen (2007 with the Chiefs and 2011 with the Vikings) and Kevin Greene (1994 with the Steelers and 1996 with the Panthers). The Chiefs and the Vikings have had the most players lead the NFL in sacks with 4. Eight players have led the NFL in sacks twice, and nobody has led the league three times.

NFL sack leaders

Note that the sack totals from 1960 to 1981 are considered unofficial by the NFL.

Table updated through the  NFL season.

Most sack titles

AFL sack leaders

See also
 List of National Football League career sacks leaders
 List of National Football League annual interceptions leaders
 List of National Football League annual forced fumbles leaders

References

Pro-Football-Reference.com

Sacks leaders
National Football League trophies and awards
National Football League lists